Jim Rutenberg is a writer at large for The New York Times and The New York Times Magazine. He has written over 2,300 articles for The New York Times.

Career 
After finishing college in 1991, Rutenberg began working for the New York Daily News as a gossip stringer. He eventually worked his way up to becoming a general assignment reporter. In 1996, he was hired on staff and became a transit beat reporter. He left the Daily News in 1999 to work as a TV reporter for The New York Observer. One year later, he began working for The New York Times, where he was responsible for covering media and local politics. He has also served as City Hall Bureau Chief, and later as chief political correspondent for the Sunday magazine. In January 2016 he was named media columnist. In January 2020, he became a writer at large for The New York Times and The New York Times Magazine.

Family 
Rutenberg is married to designer Ondine Karady.

Awards 
 2020: Gerald Loeb Award for best feature

Selected bibliography 
 "Planet Fox", with Jonathan Mahler, The New York Times Magazine
 "Part 1: Imperial Reach", April 3, 2019
 "Part 2: Internal Divisions", April 3, 2019
 "Part 3: The New Fox Weapon", April 3, 2019

References

External links 
The New York Times articles index

American male journalists
Living people
The New York Times writers
Year of birth missing (living people)
Gerald Loeb Award winners for Feature